The 2000 Canadian Mixed Curling Championship was held January 8–16 at the Lethbridge Curling Club in Lethbridge, Alberta.

Teams

Standings

Results

Draw 1

Draw 2

Draw 3

Draw 4

Draw 5

Draw 6

Draw 7

Draw 8

Draw 9

Draw 10

Draw 11

Draw 12

Draw 13

Draw 14

Draw 15

Draw 16

Draw 17

Tiebreakers

Tiebreaker #1

Tiebreaker #2

Tiebreaker #3

Playoffs

1 vs. 2

3 vs. 4

Semifinal

Final

External links
Event statistics

References

Canadian Mixed Curling Championship
Curling competitions in Alberta
2000 in Canadian curling
2000 in Alberta
Sport in Lethbridge
January 2000 sports events in Canada